The Lockheed Model 18 Lodestar is a passenger transport aircraft of the World War II era.

Design and development
Sales of the 10–14 passenger Lockheed Model 14 Super Electra, which first flew in 1937, had proved disappointing, despite the aircraft's excellent performance, as it was more expensive to operate than the larger Douglas DC-3,  already in widespread use.

The prototype for the revised airliner, designated Model 18 by Lockheed, was converted from the fourth Model 14, one of a batch which had been returned to the manufacturer by Northwest Airlines after a series of crashes. The modified aircraft first flew in this form on September 21, 1939, another two prototypes being converted from Model 14s, with the first newly built Model 18 flying on February 2, 1940.

A total of 625 Lodestars of all variants were built.

Operational history

The Lodestar received its Type certificate on March 30, 1940, allowing it to enter service with the first customer, Mid-Continent Airlines that month. As hoped, the extra seats greatly improved the Model 18's economics, reducing its seat-mile costs to a similar level to that of the DC-3, while retaining superior performance. Despite this, sales to US domestic customers were relatively slow as most US airlines were already committed to the DC-3, with only 31 Lodestars going to US airlines. Overseas sales were a little better, with the biggest airline customers being South African Airways (21), New Zealand National Airways Corporation (13), Trans-Canada Air Lines (12) and BOAC (9); another 29 were bought by the Royal Netherlands East Indies Army Air Force. Various Pratt & Whitney and Wright Cyclone powerplants were installed.

When the United States started to build up its military air strength in 1940–41, many American-operated Lodestars were impressed as the C-56. This was followed by the construction of many new-build Lodestars which were flown by the U.S. Army Air Forces as the C-60 and by the U.S. Navy and U.S. Marine Corps as the R5O. Lend-lease aircraft were used by the RNZAF as transports.

One was purchased in 1942 to serve as Brazilian President Getúlio Vargas' personal aircraft. This aircraft was specially designed for that purpose and had 11 seats.

After the war many Lodestars were overhauled and returned to civilian service, mostly as executive transports such as Dallas Aero Service's DAS Dalaero conversion, Bill Lear's Learstar (produced by PacAero), and Howard Aero's Howard 250. A few of the latter were converted to tricycle landing gear.

While the surviving New Zealand NZNAC aircraft were sold back overseas in 1951/52, six more were later imported and converted for aerial topdressing.

A single Lodestar served with the Israeli Air Force during the 1948 Arab-Israeli War.

A number of skydiving operations in the United States used Lodestars during the 1970s and 1980s.

Variants
18-07
Powered by two 875 hp Pratt & Whitney Hornet S1E2-G engines; 25 built plus two prototypes.
18-08
Powered by two 1,200 hp Pratt & Whitney Twin Wasp S1C3-G engines; 33 built.
18-10
Powered by two 1,200 hp Pratt & Whitney Twin Wasp S1C3-G engines; 39 built.
18-14
Powered by two 1,200 hp Pratt & Whitney Twin Wasp S4C4-G engines; four built.
18-40
Powered by two 1,200 hp Wright Cyclone G-1820-G104A engines; 26 built.
18-50
Powered by two 1,200hp Wright Cyclone G-1820-G202A engines; 13 built.
18-56
Powered by two 1,200hp Wright Cyclone GR-1820-G205A, R-1820-40 or R-1820-87 engines.

US Army Lodestars
C-56
Powered by 1,200 hp Wright 1820-89 engines, one Model 18-50 for evaluation.
C-56A
One impressed Model 18-07 with two Pratt & Whitney R-1690-54 engines.
C-56B
Thirteen impressed Model 18-40s with two Wright 1820-97 engines.
C-56C
Twelve impressed Model 18-07.
C-56D
Seven impressed Model 18-08.
C-56E
Two Model 18-40s impressed in 1943.
C-57
As Model 18-14 powered by two 1,200 hp Pratt & Whitney R-1830-53 engines.
C-57A
Allocated for impressed aircraft, not used.
C-57B
Based on Model 18-08 fitted for trooping; seven aircraft built.
C-57C
Repowered C-60A with Pratt & Whitney R-1830-51 engines; three aircraft converted.
C-57D
Repowered C-57C with Pratt & Whitney R-1830-92 engines; one aircraft converted.
C-59
Based on Model 18-07 powered by Pratt & Whitney R-1690-25 Hornet engines; 10 aircraft built, transferred to Royal Air Force as Lodestar IA.
C-60
Model 18-56 powered by Wright R-1820-87 engines; 36 aircraft built, some transferred to RAF as Lodestar II.
C-60A
As the C-60 but fitted out as a paratroop transport powered by Pratt & Whitney R-1830 Twin Wasp engines; 325 aircraft built.
XC-60B
One C-60A fitted with experimental de-icing equipment.
C-60C
Proposed 21-seat troop transport aircraft, never built.
C-66
Powered by Wright R-1820-87 engines; one aircraft built, 11-passenger interior for transfer to the Brazilian Air Force.
C-104
Original designation for C-60C

US Navy Lodestars
XR5O-1
One Model 18-07 acquired for evaluation powered by 1,200 hp (895 kW) Wright R-1820-40 engines.
R5O-1
Staff transport powered by 1,200 hp (895 kW) Wright R-1820-97 engines; three aircraft built, two for the USN and one for the United States Coast Guard.
R5O-2
Navy version of the C-59 powered by 850 hp (634 kW) Pratt & Whitney R-1690-25 engines; one aircraft built.
R5O-3
Powered by 1,200 hp (895 kW) Pratt & Whitney R-1830-34A engines. Originally 4-seater VIP transports; three aircraft built.
R5O-4
Powered by 1,200 hp (895 kW) Wright R-1820-40 engines. Impressed. 7-seater staff transports; 12 aircraft built.
R5O-5
Navy version of the C-60 powered by 1,200 hp (895 kW) Wright R-1820-40 engines. Similar to the R5O-4 but had 14-seats; 38 aircraft built and three former NEIAF aircraft.
R5O-6
Navy version of the C-60A for the US Marine Corps, equipped with 18 paratroop seats; 35 built.

Operators

Civil operators

Trans-Australia Airlines (TAA)  - two, operated 1952–1953.

SABENA (mainly in Africa)

Lloyd Aéreo Boliviano (LAB)

Linhas Aéreas Wright
NAB – Navegação Aérea Brasileira
Panair do Brasil - 6 Model 18-10s delivered new.
SAVAG (Sociedade Anônima Viação Aérea Gaúcha) - Two Model 18-10s bought from Panair do Brasil.
Transportes Aéreos Universal
Viação Aérea Bahiana

Trans-Canada Air Lines - 12 Model 18-10s delivered new.)
Yukon Southern Air Transport - Two Model 18-10s delivered new.)
Canadian Pacific Air Lines (purchased Yukon Southern Air Transport in 1941)

Línea Aérea Nacional (LAN) (1943–1953)
CINTA Chilean Airlines (1953–1959)

Karhumäki Airways

Air Afrique (the prewar airline, unrelated to the postwar airline of the same name) - Five Model 18-07s delivered new.)
Air France - Three Model 18-07s delivered new.
Aero Africaine (part of Société Africaine des Transports Tropicaux (SATT), based in Algeria)

TACA Airways System
East African Airways - Received six ex-BOAC Model 18-07s in 1948.

Union Airways of New Zealand (1945–1947)
National Airways Corporation (post 1947)

Aero Portuguesa
DETA Mozambique Airways (serving Portugal's colony of Mozambique)

Caribbean-Atlantic Airlines 

South African Airways Purchased 29 Model 18-08s from new.
Commercial Air Services operated two aircraft.

Linjeflyg (1957–1960)

British West Indian Airways

BOAC (British Overseas Airways Corporation) - Purchased nine, new-build, Model 18-07s supplemented by 29 second hand aircraft (Model 18-07, 18-10, 18-40, 18-50 C-59, C60 and C60A).)

Continental Air Lines - Two Model 18-08s and three 18-10s delivered new.
Mid-Continent Airlines - Three Model 18-07s and one Model 18-10 delivered new.
National Airlines - Three Model 18-50s delivered new.
Pan American Airways - Six Model 18-10s delivered new.
United Air Lines - Four Model 18-10s delivered new.
Inland Air Lines - One Model 18-08 delivered new.
Western Air Lines (purchased Inland Air Lines in 1944 and operated it as a separate division)
Alaska Star Airlines (renamed to Alaska Airlines in 1944) (one Model 18-56)

Línea Aeropostal Venezolana (LAV) - One Model 18-10 delivered new.)

Military operators

Royal Australian Air Force

Brazilian Air Force (Seven × C-60A and one C-66)

Royal Canadian Air Force (18 × C-60A)
No. 164 Squadron RCAF
No. 165 Squadron RCAF

Colombian Air Force (C-60 as VIP transport)
 
Haiti Air Corps

Israeli Air Force

Mexican Air Force

Royal Netherlands East Indies Air Force (20 Model 18-40s and nine Model 18-50s delivered)

Royal New Zealand Air Force
No. 40 Squadron RNZAF
No. 41 Squadron RNZAF

Norwegian Air Force (Three delivered to the Norwegian government in exile)

South African Air Force

Royal Air Force

United States Army Air Corps
United States Navy
United States Marine Corps
United States Coast Guard

Accidents and incidents

Between 1941-1944, the Panair do Brasil airline suffered 4 accidents involving the Lodestar which resulted in a total of 57 fatalities.

In January 1943, Lockheed Lodestar Mk.II EW986, c/n 2154, in the service of the Royal Air Force, overshot and crashed 3 km south of Heliopolis, Egypt. At least 12 crew members and passengers died in the crash. A cause of the accident was not determined. Among those killed were Air Vice-Marshal Wilfred Ashton McClaughry, CB, DSO, MC, DFC and Lady Rosalinde Tedder née MacLardy, wife of Marshal of the Royal Air Force Arthur William Tedder, 1st Baron Tedder, GCB.

In 1949, a Lockheed Lodestar in airline service in Australia crashed immediately after takeoff.  All 21 occupants died in the crash or the ensuing conflagration.  The cause of the accident was determined to be that the center of gravity was behind the rear limit.  It is also likely the elevator trim tab was set for landing rather than takeoff.

On March 22, 1958, Mike Todd's private plane Lucky Liz, named after his wife Elizabeth Taylor, crashed near Grants, New Mexico. The plane, a twin-engine Lockheed Lodestar, suffered engine failure while being flown overloaded, in icing conditions at too-high an altitude for the loading. The plane went out of control and crashed, killing all four on board.

On September 4, 1962, a Lockheed 18-56-24 Lodestar operated by the Ashland Oil and Refining Company crashed near Lake Milton, Ohio.  The flight was in-route to Ashland Regional Airport (KDWU) from Buffalo Airport, NY.  Eleven passengers and two crew-members were killed. Investigation determined the crash a result of a malfunction of the electric elevator trim tab, which caused the loss of the plane's right wing during flight.

On August 21, 1983, a Lockheed L-18 LEARStar operated by Landry Aviation, Inc. crashed near Silvana, Washington.  The flight was a planned parachute drop carrying two pilots and 22 parachutists.  Nine parachutists and two crew-members were killed while 13 were able to parachute to safety after the pilots lost control and entered a vertical descent from 12,500 feet. Investigation determined the crash a result of a failure of the operator and pilot-in-command to assure proper load distribution during the parachute drop.

Surviving aircraft

Brazil
 FAB 2006 – C-60A on static display at the Museu Aeroespacial in Rio de Janeiro.

Canada
 c/n 18-2064 – L18-08 under restoration by students at the Aerospace Centre of the University of the Fraser Valley for static display at the Canadian Museum of Flight. It was previously on display at the Victory Air Museum in Mundelein, Illinois.
 c/n 18-2220 – L18-08 in storage at the Reynolds-Alberta Museum in Wetaskiwin, Alberta. It was previously registered as CF-TDB.

Finland
 c/n 18-2006 – L18-56 on static display at the Finnish Aviation Museum in Helsinki. It was previously registered as OH-VKU, N9955F, N9965F, and F-ARTF.

New Zealand
 c/n 18-2020 – C-60 on static display at the Museum of Transport and Technology in Western Springs, Auckland. It was built for United Airlines in October 1940 and registered as NC25630. It was impressed into United States Army Air Forces with the serial number 42-53504. In September 1941 it was transferred to the Royal Air Force as AX756. Next, it was operated as G-AGCN by the British Overseas Airways Corporation in East Africa. After serving with the Spanish Air Force, it was sold back to the United States where it was registered as N9933F. Sold again to FieldAir in either 1957 or 1958 it was converted to an aerial topdresser and given the registration ZK-BVE. It was damaged in a wheels up landing in 1969.
 c/n 18-2152 – C-60 under restoration with the Gisborne Aviation Preservation Society in Gisborne, Gisborne. It was previously operated by the Royal Air Force as EW984 and Spanish Air Force. Sold to civilian ownership, it was first registered in the United States as N9930F in 1955. It was converted to an aerial topdresser by Fieldair in 1957 and registered as ZK-BUV. It was a gate guardian at Gisborne Airport from 1973 to 1998.
 c/n 18-2388 – L18-56 on static display at the National Transport and Toy Museum in Wanaka.

Norway
 c/n 18-2444 – C-60A on static display with the Norwegian Armed Forces Aircraft Collection at Gardermoen.

South Africa
 c/n 18-2026 – L18-08 on static display at the South African Airways Museum in Germiston, Gauteng. It was previously operated by South African Airways as ZS-ASN.

Sweden
 c/n 18-0056 – L18-56 on static display at the Flygsamlingar Arlanda in Märsta, Stockholm.

United States
 c/n 18-2035 – XC-60B on static display at the Castle Air Museum at the former Castle Air Force Base in Atwater, California.
 c/n 18-2404 – R5O-5 airworthy with Lawrence E. Hill of Marion, Montana.
 c/n 18-2302 – C-60 on display at the 1940 Air Terminal Museum in Houston, Texas. It has been converted for use as an executive aircraft.
 c/n 18-2347 – C-60 in storage in Corinth, Mississippi.
 c/n 18-6124 – L18-56 airworthy with Chris Galloway of Knights Landing, California.
 41-19729 – C-56 on static display at the Travis Air Force Base Heritage Center at Travis Air Force Base near Fairfield, California.
 42-32181 – C-60 on static display at the Planes of Fame Air Museum in Chino, California.
 42-55884 – C-60A airworthy with Gary Hilton of Kingsville, Missouri.
 42-56005 – C-60A airworthy with the Houston Wing of the Commemorative Air Force in Houston, Texas.
 42-56036 – C-60A airworthy with the Mid America Flight Museum in Mount Pleasant, Texas.
 43-16445 – C-60A on static display at the National Museum of the United States Air Force at Wright-Patterson Air Force Base in Dayton, Ohio.
 43-16462 – C-60A on static display at the Planes of Fame Museum in Chino, California.
 12473 – R5O-5 on static display at the March Field Air Museum at March Air Reserve Base (former March Air Force Base) in Riverside, California.
 12481 – R5O-5 on static display at the Pima Air & Space Museum adjacent to Davis-Monthan Air Force Base in Tucson, Arizona.

Uruguay
 c/n 18-2349 – C-60 on static display at the Museo Aeronáutico Jaime Meregalli at Carrasco Airport near Montevideo. It was seized as a smuggler in the 1980s.

Specifications (C-60A-5)

See also

Notes

Bibliography
 Andrade, John. U.S. Military Aircraft Designations and Serial, since 1909. Hersham, Surrey, UK: Midland Counties Publications, 1979. .
 .
 Stanaway, John C. Vega Ventura: The Operational Story of Lockheed's Lucky Star. Atglen, PA: Schiffer Publishing, 2000. .

 Taylor, John W. R. Jane's All The World's Aircraft 1965-66. London: Sampson Low, Marston, 1965.

External links
 

Aircraft first flown in 1939
Lodestar
Low-wing aircraft
1930s United States airliners
1930s United States military transport aircraft
World War II transport aircraft of the United States
Twin piston-engined tractor aircraft
Twin-tail aircraft